Tracy Webster (born April 7, 1971) is a former American basketball coach. Webster worked as an assistant coach at Kentucky, Illinois, Purdue, Ball State, DePaul, Nebraska, Tennessee, and Cal.  He was the interim head coach at DePaul from January 11, 2010 until April 7, 2010, amassing a 1–14 regular season record and a 0–1 record in the Big East tournament.

Webster was a basketball letterman and team captain at the University of Wisconsin–Madison, where, in 1994, he helped lead the Badgers to their first NCAA tournament appearance in over 40 years.  He picked up All-Big Ten honors three times and his 179 assists in 1992–93 are a Wisconsin single-season record. In 1991–92, he set the school season mark with a .490 three-point percentage.

Webster is a 1990 graduate of Thornton Township High School in Harvey, Illinois.

References

1971 births
Living people
American men's basketball coaches
American men's basketball players
Ball State Cardinals men's basketball coaches
Basketball players from Illinois
Basketball coaches from Illinois
California Golden Bears men's basketball coaches
DePaul Blue Demons men's basketball coaches
Guards (basketball)
Illinois Fighting Illini men's basketball coaches
Kentucky Wildcats men's basketball coaches
Nebraska Cornhuskers men's basketball coaches
People from Harvey, Illinois
Purdue Boilermakers men's basketball coaches
Sportspeople from Cook County, Illinois
Tennessee Volunteers basketball coaches
Wisconsin Badgers men's basketball players
Wisconsin–Parkside Rangers men's basketball coaches